Humo may refer to:

People
 Avdo Humo (1914–1983), Bosnian politician
 Hamza Humo (1895–1970), Bosnian author
 Olga Humo (1919–2013), Yugoslav partisan, writer and university professor
 Yuan Humo, Chinese empress

Places
 Humo Ice Dome, Uzbekistan

Other
 HUMO, Belgian tabloid
 Humo Tashkent
 Humorology
 humo, the Spanish word for "smoke".